Jijeli, or Jijel Arabic, is a variety of Arabic spoken specifically in the Jijel Province in northeastern Algeria, but traces of it reach parts of the neighboring Skikda and Mila Provinces. It is quite different from all the other Arabic dialects spoken in eastern Algeria and has probably survived into present times because of the geographic enclavement of that mountainous area and the difficulty of terrestrial connections with the rest of the country for centuries.

Jijel is a relic of the Pre-Hilalian Arabic dialects (resulting from the Muslim conquest of the Maghreb in the 7th and 8th centuries) once spoken over all of Constantine, Algeria but later mixed with Bedouin Hilalian dialects brought by the invasion of the Banu Hilal in the 11th century.

Pre-Hilalian Arabic dialects remained intact only in a small area around Jijel while they were heavily mixed with bedouin dialects in the areas of Constantine, Mila, Collo and El Milia. Pre-Hilalian dialects also remain in the urban areas of Fez, Rabat, Tlemcen, Constantine and Tunis. Tlemcen Arabic and Jijel Arabic remain very close.

See also
Varieties of Arabic
Maghrebi Arabic
Jebli Arabic

References

Languages of Algeria
Maghrebi Arabic
Jijel Province